Carex projecta, the necklace sedge, is a species of sedge that was first described by Kenneth Mackenzie in 1908.

References

projecta
Plants described in 1908